The eleventh season of The Bachelorette features, for the first time ever, two Bachelorettes during the first episode. Kaitlyn Bristowe is a 29-year-old spin-class instructor from Leduc, Alberta, and Britt Nilsson is a 28-year-old waitress from Michigan, living in California. Bristowe finished in third place and Nilsson in sixth on season 19 of The Bachelor featuring Chris Soules.

This season premiered on May 18, 2015 with Bristowe selected as the Bachelorette. The finale aired on July 27, 2015 with Bristowe accepting a proposal from 28-year-old personal trainer Shawn Booth. On November 2, 2018, the couple announced they ended their engagement.

Production

Casting and contestants
Casting began during the tenth season of The Bachelorette. Kaitlyn Bristowe and Britt Nilsson were initially listed as bachelorette candidates on March 9, 2015 during the After the Final Rose special on the nineteenth season of The Bachelor.

The cast includes Ryan McDill, who is the ex-boyfriend of The Bachelor season 18 winner Nikki Ferrell.

During the first episode, the Bachelors decide which of the ladies they would like to have as the Bachelorette for this season. In the second episode, which aired on May 19, 2015, it was revealed that Bristowe was selected as the new Bachelorette.

Filming and development
It began filming shortly after the finale of the nineteenth season of The Bachelor with the locale destinations including New York City, San Antonio and Ireland with appearances from Laila Ali, Amy Schumer, Doug E. Fresh and The Cranberries.

Contestants
In week 4, season 10 runner-up Nick Viall joined the cast.

Future Appearances

The Bachelor
Ben Higgins was chosen as the lead of the twentieth season of The Bachelor. Nick Viall was chosen as the lead of the twenty-first season of The Bachelor.

Bachelor in Paradise
Season 2

J.J. Lane III, Jonathan Holloway, Tanner Tolbert, Joshua Albers, Joe Bailey, Justin Reich, and Jared Haibon returned for the second season of Bachelor in Paradise. Holloway was eliminated during week 2. Bailey during week 4. Lane quit the show during week 3. Haibon during week 5. Albers split from his partner, Tenley Molzahn, during week 6. Reich left Paradise in a relationship with his partner, Cassandra Ferguson. Tolbert ended the season engaged to his partner, Jade Roper.

Season 3

Haibon, Viall and Ryan Beckett returned for the third season of Bachelor in Paradise. Beckett was eliminated during week 4. Haibon quit the show during week 5. Viall split from his partner, Jennifer Saviano, during week 6.

Season 4

Ben Zorn returned for the fourth season of Bachelor in Paradise. He quit the show during week 3.

Australia season 1

Haibon appeared on the Australian version of Bachelor in Paradise. He arrived during the 3rd week and quit during week 7.

Dancing with the Stars
Viall competed in the twenty-fourth season of Dancing With the Stars. He partnered with Peta Murgatroyd and finished in 7th place. Bristowe competed in and won the twenty-ninth season of the show with her partner Artem Chigvintsev.

The Bachelor Winter Games
Higgins returned for The Bachelor Winter Games as a part of Team USA. He quit during week 3.

The Bachelorette
Bristowe was named as the interim host for The Bachelorette in seasons 17 and 18 alongside future lead Tayshia Adams, replacing Chris Harrison.

Call-out order

 The contestant received the first impression rose
 The contestant received a rose during a date
 The contestant was eliminated
 The contestant was eliminated during a date
 The contestant quit the competition
 The contestant was disqualified from the competition
 The contestant was eliminated outside the rose ceremony
 The contestant moved on to the next week by default
 The contestant won the competition

Episodes

Controversies

Snapchat spoiler
On June 12, weeks before the finale of the season, Bristowe posted a picture on Snapchat of her and Shawn Booth, her final choice, in bed together.

Notes

References

External links

2015 American television seasons
The Bachelorette (American TV series) seasons
Television shows filmed in California
Television shows filmed in New York City
Television shows filmed in Texas
Television shows filmed in the Republic of Ireland
Television shows filmed in Utah